was a Japanese stone sculptor who lived in France. He preferred abstract form in public sculpture within architectural contexts and took part in several symposia on sculpture in Europe, the US, Israel, and Japan.

Biography
Yasuo Mizui entered into Kobe University in 1944. During World War II, he worked as technician at a company and learned casting.  After his graduation in 1947, he entered Tokyo University of the Arts and majored in Sculpture. He was taught by Kazuo Kikuchi and Hirakushi Denchū.  The reason of shifting his interest from mechanical engineering to sculpture was because he hoped of possibility of power of art, which has no frontier nor war and he chose "Art casting – Casting daibutsu" as his thesis.

After graduation from Tokyo University of the Arts in 1953, he obtained a scholarship from French government to study further at École nationale supérieure des beaux-arts de Paris from 1953 to 1958, where he learned monumental art and sculpture from Alfred Janniot and Marcel Gimond.  He apprenticed Apel·les Fenosa from 1954 to 1958 while studying at the university. While visiting the atelier, Fenosa assigned Mizui to create one piece of work made by clay every day upon his arrival. After several months, Mizui felt despair from his own creativity. However, he managed to create one at the last minute.  This experience helped his subsequent career to attend the International Sculpture Symposium and to create large monumental works under the French program 1% for art.

Works for Olympic games in Japan and France
He has created walls of sculptures Les murs des fossils (Walls of fossils) for Tokyo Olympic games in Tokyo, Japan in 1964 and Microcosme et macrocosme for Winter Olympic Games in Grenoble, France.

Les murs des fossils (Walls of Fossils) (granite / 2mx 93x 0.3 / 1964 / Yoyogi National Gymnasium)
Yoyogi National Gymnasium is arena for athletic games, located in Yoyogi Park, Tokyo, designed by Kenzo Tange and it was built between 1961 and 1964. Mizui received a request from Tange in February 1964 and created the wall of art with ten other assistants in Kitagi island for three months, then, delivered it to Tokyo in August for completion. Foreign media introduced its works in September.
The length of the large abstract wall of reliefs is 93 m in total. They consist of 408 pieces of 1 m 82 cm x 60 cm x 30 cm Mikage stone and the total weight is 160 tons. These Mikage stones come from Kitagi Island, also known as "Stone Island", in Okayama, Japan. 
His concept Walls of Fossiles expresses 10 landscapes in his deep involvement with experience of life and nature-like memory as fossils; Travel – Flame – Weight – Perfume – Obsession – Water – Wisdom – Sound – Time – Light. As always, he carved all works by hand using chisels and large and small hammer.

"Macrocosm and microcosm" (stone / 13 m x 81 x 0.4 / Olympic Village Grenoble). Two walls of 40 m – the "macrocosm and microcosm" – are expressed as the maximum and the minimum of the world. "The Maximum" symbolizes the great life of nature as Sun, Forest, Mountain, Sea, and River beyond the individual matter and "the Minimum" symbolizes the inner conflict of human beings. They express the world of nature and human beings. Tadao Takemoto, who translated the book "Anti-retrospective" (Shincho Sha, Japan, 1977) by André Malraux, often referred to Mizui about him. During the term, he, Minister of Cultural Affairs under Charles de Gaulle regime, who has deep knowledge of arts, visited the Olympic Village. He saw the wall of art and said to Mizui "Excellent!".

1% for art

In France, the law of 1951 provides that 1% of the state budget is spent on the decoration of public buildings with artwork. The majority of the works of Mizui in France are created under 1% for art. He has been built 26 sculptures between 1968 and 1982(for 14 years). For The first order from French cultural ministry was to create sculpture at Bordeaux University (department of law) in 1968, where he built Jet d'eau pétrifiée (Petrified waterjet). This request was made after his reputation towards Microcosme et Macrocosme at Winter Olympic games in Grenoble. Le Mur qui s'ouvre (Wall that Opens)(cement / 4.5m x 13 x 1.4 / 1972/ located in Lycée Louis Bascan, Rambouillet) is a retaining wall. The artist used molds of expanded polyester material that cut through the electrical resistance, a very specific technique that Mizui has obtained from his engineering background.

Symposium

The sculpture symposium gave Mizui an opportunity for a new direction to develop and promote a sense of sculptural monumentality in the urban beauty. It also provided competitions among artists to demonstrate one's ability to create the same material. This movement has been achieved since 1959 in St. Margrethen in Germany.  The first participation of Mizui was in Austria in 1960. He discovered the charm of work from large stone blocks of 4 meters. In 1962, he created the work, Clef d'amour (Key of Love) (stone /4m x 0.9 x 0.6) before the Berlin Wall in Germany. The new bank had the slogan of this symposium: "The wall to the east, creating a sculpture to the west ." The Symposium was awarded German critique prize. He stated " There is a wall between east and west. The wall he created a sad story every day. Our silent anger supported this meeting." Location of the statue has been moved and currently presented at Berlin Square in Germany. The following year in 1963, he participated International Sculpture Symposium at Manazuru City, Kanagawa Prefecture in Japan, as a leader, under the financial support from Asahi Shimbun Company, where 11 other sculptors from eight different countries also participated.

Diagonal Yin Yang
 
There is a Fontaine-de-Vaucluse near to Lacoste where Mizui lived. This is a mysterious fountain, which has a love story, dated back to the 14th century.  He stated: "Why not, Nachi Falls gush somewhere in France as the rain hollows constantly rocks the fountain." When he visited Nachi Falls in Japan later on, his heart and body trembled in front of the cascade and he was convinced: " Waterfall Nachi had really pierced the earth and it rebounds into Fontaine-de-Valucluse." He, at the age of 70 years old, realized "Diagonal Yin Yang" was divided between Japan and France; Two paths, two unfinished cultures. He often questions the place of the two extremes in his sculptural work where he felt caught between the Hammer (tool) and Anvil. Along with these two realizations that coexist in his work, one under the influence of another, the Yin and Yang characters are also identified by Mizui, Japan as ( Yin ), and France as ( Yang ). This assimilation takes more consistency with the movement that brings these two countries. It is in the conversation and the confrontation between the aspects Yin and Yang, which constantly oppose each other, are answered, push, and embraces he discovers, though this sculpture as a new form. River, a house, or a woman's appearance, are as Yin elements. While a flower, a tree, an animal, and a patron will generally have the character of Yang. He constantly questions the expression of his sculpture in terms of strengths Yin or Yang. He himself says "The response looks like a mask play between truth and falsehood." Mizui heard by his friend, Tadao Takemoto, who is the writer of Andre Malraux and Nachi Waterfall; André Malraux said "Nachi Waterfall is the backbone of the Shintoism."

Diagonal Yin Yang is a series of 40 stone sculptures, made in Japan for the exhibition at Gallery Tatuno Hiranomachi, Osaka, Japan, in 1965. After this exhibition, all his works were transferred to France, in the garden of his residence in Lacoste.  Two statues were offered on the occasion of the exhibition at Luxeuil-les-Bains in 2013.

Wall of Hope
In 1985, during a project with Seita Onishi, a Japanese business man, and philanthropist, Mizui was keen on the actor James Dean. Together, they had a goal, to create a James Dean Center, which would be located in Cholame, in California in the United States, near the place of the fatal car accident of James Dean.Earlier year in 1981, Mizui had been created and placed chromium cenotaph for James Dean, commissioned by Onishi, near to the place his accident.

Mizui worked on James Dean Center project for three years, creating sketches and sculptures, as well as visiting the United States. Following a conflict of opinion with the owner of the proposed Center site, the project could not be fulfilled. Yet the "Wall of Hope" remains, a monumental sculpture (Limestone/13 x 4,50 x 1,20 m) dedicated to the memory of James Dean; this sculpture took three years for him to complete; it consists of 150 tons of stone extracted from the quarry of Lacoste, in the village where he lived. On one of the sides of the "Wall of Hope", he sculpted in stone the face of the film icon. "I said to myself, the three masterpieces of James Dean saved his fans from despair, the desperate walls open and give us the light of hope", the artist explains. The "Wall of Hope" was inaugurated in 2006, 51 years after the death of the actor, and, though not in California, it welcomes visitors to the garden, like an open-air museum, of Mizui, in Lacoste.

Stone and Asceticism
Mizui said: "Given the immense nature, I felt myself very small. In addition, the stone has rough context, but it is already so beautiful.
Although I talked, insulted, and sighed him, he remained transferable and quietly annoyed in spite of my pleas and anger. However, after some time, the stone started to talk. It was he who guided me; Not so! And there! Yes, like this. If I can one day to melt into the divine nothingness, my sculpture will remain as an offering to the great nature. Jean- Rosenberg, science professor at University of Poitiers, told about the sculpture of Mizui; In his non-figurative art, the temporal dimension is absent. There are no messages coded by symbols or figures. His work is cosmic. One feels the origin of life and evolution; it represents the universal entities, which have not individualized, but as they stand at the beginning of evolution.

Métagraphie 
The technique of compressing a color between two sheets of paper or two other materials gave rise to unexpected fantastic images. The artist analyzed the causality of phenomena that may be considered accidental. In other words, it is to introduce the power of the will in the creation of such phenomena, by developing a technique and practice. This process expresses the reflection, change, succession, and the fact of going beyond, beside, and between etc. Obtained by a non-reproducible process, the métagraphie implies that the artist makes the slide watercolor on waterproof paper, then lets it have the chance to act on the matter. His own response is to find the right balance between the fluidity of watercolor and the exposure time. There are similar techniques, such as pressed oil, starch-pressed, and the decal. But the manner and the choice of material of Mizui are different. An international critic of Fine Arts, Sakae Hasegawa, said in 1984: "When I saw this painting for the first time, I thought this was a picture of a snowy mountain. But looking closer, it was not a picture and this picture had a strong resonance in me, it perceives cold silence. I find this painting conveys a philosophical and meditative opening, as if he could let the silence of the heart.".

Four completed forms

1. The sculpture of the oscillation / Oscillo-Relief, 1972–1982
Oscillo-Relief cut is the shape obtained by the vertical oscillatory motion and horizontal oscillation of an electrical resistance. This free form is not the result of a prior plan, but the technique requires precise control. Oscillo-Relief is a fundamental invention of Mizui. He applied the technique to his sculptures in 1972. He was invited for The 2nd Henry Moore Grand Prize Exhibition at Hakone Open-Air Museum, in Nagano Prefecture, Japan in 1981, created Oscillo-complex(stone / 3m x 1.3 x 1.2), and received Special Prize at the exhibition.

2. The Wall Sculpture, 1964 –
"Cosmos"(stone / 15m x 18 x 0.06 / 1970 / Lycée Louis Armand in Villefranche-sur-Saône ). 360 flagstones of Comblanchien, unit of 6 cm thick, are firmly fixed on the wall. Mizui himself said, "I wanted to create a shadow graphics and light evoking heaven, earth and man.". The wall sculpture recalls, in formal terms, Walls of Fossiles and "Macrocosme et Microcosme".

3. The sculpture "Largeg Head", 1960–1971
"Hommage à Néguev (To Neguev)" (marble / 3.7m x 1.7 x 0.6 / 1962 / Mitzpe Ramon, Israel, Symposium) performed on the occasion of a Symposium in Israel. About this experience, the artist expresses himself in these words: It was a real brainwashing life for two months in the Negev desert. I felt my sculpture as a drop in the sea with immensity of nature. This is the first time that I could hold chisel with sincerely humble. When I made an elliptical hole in the top part, I felt that sun light was rising towards me.

4. The Sculpture ZIG and ZAG, 1973–1974
"ZIG and ZAG" (stone / 2m x 0.4 x 0.4 / 1973 / Savannah College of Art and Design, Lacoste). Mizui first worked with blocks of polystyrene by cutting them to see the final shape of sculpture. He directed dozens of works like this. In the fifties, Parisian artists like to establish their workshop in Provence. The New Yorker painter, Bernard Pfriem, opened an art school to bring American students in the center of the village of Lacoste, France. This school is located in a large house located next to the ancient castle, The Marquis de Sade. He had remained relationship with the school for 20 years, taught students about stone sculpture every summer, and made one piece of work with them every year.

Selected chronology 
 1925 Born on 30 May in Kyoto, Japan
 1944 Graduated from Kyoto Daiichi Industrial high school in Kyoto, Japan, majored in mechanical engineering
 1945 During World War II, worked as a technician in Hyogo, Japan
 1947 Graduated from Kobe University in Hyogo, Japan, majored in mechanical engineering
 1953 Graduated from Tokyo University of the Arts in Tokyo, Japan, majored in sculpture
 1953 Obtained scholarship from French government to study at École des Beaux-Arts in Paris, France, majored in Sculpture
 1954 (until 1958) Apprenticed from Apel·les Fenosa in Paris, France
 1958 Graduated from École des Beaux-Arts in Paris, France
 1959 Participated Biennale de Paris France, awarded A. Susse individual prize from Tombeau des corbeaux (Bird cemetery)
 1960 Participated St. Margareten international symposium, created Clef au ciel (key to heaven)
 1961 Participated Sculpture Sumposium Kaisersteinbruch in Kirchheim, Germany, created Borne III (Guide III)
 1961 Participated 1st time International sculpture symposium in Portorož, Slovenia, Borne II (Guide II)
 1962 Participated 1st time International sculpture symposium in Berlin, Germany, created Clef d'amour (Key to love)
 1962 Participated International sculpture symposium in Mizpe Ramon (Neguev), Israel, created Hommage à Néguev (Tribute to the Neguev)
 1963 Participated International sculpture symposium in Manazuru, Kanagawa Japan, created Michinashi
 1964 Created Les murs des fossils (Walls of fossils), Yoyogi National Gymnazium, in Tokyo, Japan
 1966 Participated International Czhecoslovakian symposium in Vyšné Ružbachy, Slovakia, created Hommage à Tatra (To Tatra)
 1967 Participated Olympiad Grenoble Symposium, in Grenoble, France, Macrocosme et Microcosme (Macrocosmos and Microcosmos), started "1% for art sculpture in France
 1968 Participated Vermont International Sculpture Symposium, in Vermont, USA, created Trois Traces(Three traces) 
 1969 Participated Oggelshausen symposium in Oggelshausen, Germany, created Cascade de la lumieré (this works was made first in Berlin and moved to Feeder zee in Oggelshausen)
 1975 Participated 13th Biennale of sculpeture in Antwerp, Belgium, created Les Cretes II(Stone smoke II)
 2007 Exhibition at Japanese consular in Marseille, France
 2008 Deceased in Apt, France

(After his death)
 2011 Retrospective exhibition "Yasuo Mizui" at Horikawa Miike Gallery in Kyoto, Japan
 2013 Retrospective exhibition "Yasuo Mizui" in Luxeruil-les-Bains (Haute-Saône), France
 2014 Retrospective exhibition "Yasuo Mizui" in Lacoste, France
 2015 Exposition retrospective "Yasuo Mizui" in Villeneuve-d'Ascq (Nord-Pas-de-Calais), France
 2015–17 Installation of Le gardien des nuages in the garden of Chateau of La Celle, foundation Flag-France Renaissance, in Paris, France.
 2018 April 4–28 Exposition "Yasuo Mizui, sculpteur de l'âme" in Wattrelos, France

Awards
 1959 A. Susse prize at 1st Biennale de Paris, France　
 1962 Awarded Deutscher Kritikerpreis for members who participated in 2nd Berlin Sculpture Symposium, Germany
 1964 7th Takamura prize for sculpture, Japan 
 1981 Grand prix for 2nd Henry Moore exhibition in Hakone-open Air museum, Japan
 1985 Ordre des Arts et des Lettres (commandeur) from Minister of Culture, France

His works

In France
※ Currently existing
 Tombeau des corbeaux (Bird Tomb)(bronze / 0.75m x 0.28 x 0.28 / April 1958: First Biennale Paris) Lacoste 
 Amiral:tête de cheval (Amiral: Horse Head) (bronze / 1.2m x 0.9 x 0.6 / March 1963) Bois de Boulogne, Paris.
 Dessin by the iron spatula - 3 pieces（1966、72、74 / Musée départemental de l'Oise Beauvais）
 Macrocosme Microcosme (stone / 1.3m x 81.0 x 0.4 / August 1968: Grenoble Olympics game) Village Olympique de Grenoble
 Jet d'eau pétrifiée (Fountain Fossiles) (stone / 3.2m x 8.0 x 8.0 / November 1968) University of Bordeaux
 Fleur du Midi (Flower of Provence) (stone / 3.0m x 1.0x 1.0 / December 1968) C.E.S deHyères
 Cosmos (stone /15.0m x 18.0 x 0.06 / March 1970) Cité Technique de Villefranche-sur-Saône
 Une naissance (A Birth) (stone / 1.3m x 36.0 x 0.35 / June 1970) University Institutes of Technology de Paris, Paris
 Soleil-Forêt-Fêtes (stone / 1.3m x36.0 x 0.35 / July 1970) Ecole maternelle de Avenue de Versailles, Paris
 La mer (The Sea) (stone / 1.3m x 15.0 x 0.35 / September 1970) C.E.S de Châteauroux
 Le mistral (stone / 2.5m x 70.0 x 0.4 / October 1970) C.E.S de Gardanne
 Le point de rencontre (Meeting Point) (marble and stone /1.0m x 2.0 x 2.0 / March 1971) Ecole maternelle de Avenue de Versailles, Paris
 Dialogue (stone / 3.7 m x 2.0 x 0.8 / September 1971) Université de Lorraine - l'UFR Sciences humaines et sociales Metz
 Oscillo-tower (stone / 2.0m x 0.6 x 0.6 / July 1972) SCAD Lacoste, Lacoste
 Le mur qui s'ouvre (The Wall Opens) (cement / 4.5m x 13.0 x 1.4 / December 1972) Lycée de Rambouillet
 Source de vitalité (Source of vitality) (stone / 3.0m x 5.0 x 1.0 / February 1973) Lycée Technique de Rambouillet
 La corne d'abondance (Horn of abundance)(stone / 3.0m x 4.0 x 1.0 / June 1973: Mountain and sculpture exposition) Plateau d'Assy, J.P.Lemesle)
 Zig et Zag I(Zig and Zag I) (stone/2m x 0.4 x 0.4 / July 1973) Savannah College of Art and Design, Lacoste, France
 Le signe de la vie (Sign of Life) (stone / 3.0m x 16.0 x 2.5 / September 1973) Lycée Général et Technologique & Professionnel Charles Augustin Coulomb d'Angoulème 
 Gardien du soleil (Gardian of the Sun) (stone / 4.0m x 1.0 x 1.0 / November 1973) Groupe Scolaire de Vigneux-sur-seine
 Les cimes (Mountain tops) (stone / 3.0m x 6.0 x 0.6 / May 1974) C.E.S d'Oullins, Lyon
 Le chant du coq (Rooster's song) (Polisol / 2.5m x 0.6 x 0.2 / June 1974: Exposition) Chamonix France, J.P Lemesle
 Les crêtes (Crests) (stone /2.0 m x 5.5 x 1.5/ November 1974) C.E.D de Montfort-l'Amaury
 Zig et Zag IV (stone / 0.8m x 0.25 x 0.25/ December 1974) Lacoste
 Voie lactée (Milky way)(Marble / 2.2m x 13.0 x 0.03 / January 1975) Bank of Tokyo in Paris, Reiko Hayama
 Les crêtes II (Crests II) (stone /2.0 m x 5.0 x 1.3 / June 1975: Exposition at Middelheim museum, Antwerp, Belgium) Lacoste
 Zig et Zag 2 pieces (stone / 1.0m x 0.6 x 0.6 / July 1975) SCAD Lacoste
 La porte de germination (Germination door) (stone / 5.0m x 3.0 x 0.8 / October 1975) Lycée Technique de Dombasle
 Oscillo-Cascade I (stone / 2.0m x 6.0 x 1.0 / November 1975) SCAD Lacoste
 La Sâon (Sâon River) (stone / 2.5m x 25.0 x 0.5 / December 1975) Cité Technique de Villefranche-sur-Saône
 Oscillo-arch (stone / 1.5m x 4.0 x 0.4 / July 1976) SCAD Lacoste
 Sagesse (Wisdom) (stone / 4.0m x 2.7 x 0.6 / August 1976) Campus de l'École polytechnique de Palaiseau 
 Coupe-Vent (Windbreaker) (stone / 2.0m x 38.0 x 0.35 / September 1976) Lycée de Châteaubriant, Rennes
 Une ronde (A Round) (stone / 3.4m x 5.6 x 2.6 / December 1976) / Cité Technique de Colmar
 Fête de Mer (Festival of Sea) (stone / 1.3m x 20.0 x 0.35 / March 1977) C.E.S de Bourbourg
 Oscillo-escalier (stone / 2.0m x 6.0 x 2.3 / May 1977) Villeneuve d'Ascq 
 Oscillo-element (stone / 2.0m x 1.0 x 1.0 / July 1977) SCAD Lacoste
 Oscillo-Cascade II (stone / 3.0m x 12.0 x 3.5 / October 1977)/ University of Nancy 
 Rideau d'eau (Water Curtain) (cement / 3.2m x 11.0 x 0.3 / November 1977) Fontaine de la Place de Quatre saisons, Val-de-Reuil
 Fontaine au filet d'eau (Fountain trickle) (cement / 200m2 / February 1978) Lycée-collège Léon-Blum, Villeneuve d'Ascq 
 Arc du Nuage(Arc the Cloud) (stone / 3.6m x 5.6 x 1.6 / June 1978) Lycée Michel Montaigne de Bordeaux
 Gardien du Nuage (Gardian of Cloud) (stone / 2.1m x 1.0 x 0.6 / July 1978) Lacoste
 Fontaine au filet d'eau (Fountain trickle- additional part) (cement / 10.0m x 2.7 x 0.1 / October 1978) Lycée-collège Léon-Blum, Villeneuve d'Ascq 
La pierre qui s'enfle (The stone that swells) (stone / 2.0m x 1.0 x 0.4 / July 1979) Lacoste
Diago-complex (diagonal-complex) (stone / 2.0m x 1.0 x 0.4 / July 1980) Lacoste
 L'oeuil du Cyclone (Eye of Cyclone) (stone / 2.4m x 3.0 x 0.6 / October 1980) college A.Sisley de L'Île-Saint-Denis 
Oscillo-Crêtes (Tilt and Crest) (stone / 2.4m x 7.5 x 1.8 / May 1981) Ecole du Service de Santé des Armés de Bron, Lyon
Camargue (stone / 1.2m x 2.0 x 0.6 / July 1981) Lacoste
 Arc familial (Family arch) (stone / 2.5m x 3.6 x 1.1 / May 1982) Lattes, Montpellier
Mèche au ciel (Wick to heaven) (stone / 2.0m x 0.6 x 0.45 / July 1982) Lacoste
Trois fenêtres (Three windows) (stone / 2.0m x 0.9 x 0.9 / July 1983) Lacoste
Une Constellation (A constellation) (stone / 2.0m x 1.1 x 0.6 / July 1984) Lacoste
Bénits (Blessing) (Indian sandstone red and white / 2.0m x 1.0 x 0.95 / April 1985) Lacoste
Fenêtres tournantes (Rotating windows) (Stone / 0.8m x 0.7 x 2.0 / September 1985) Lacoste
Pierre qui rit I (Laughing stone I) (Stone / 1.0m x 1.0 x 2.0 / September 1986) Lacoste
La table cactus (Cactus table) (Stone / 1.1m x 1.0 x 0.7 / July 1988) Lacoste
Mini Palais (mini Palac) (Stone / 1.1m x 1.1 x 0.95 / September 1988) Lacoste
Colonne biaise (Biaced column) (marble / 1.8m x 0.65 x 0.65 / May 1989) Lacoste
 Le mur de l'espoir (Wall of Hope - James Dean Monument)  (Limestone / 13.0m x 4.5 x 1.2 / August 1989) Lacoste, Vaucluse
Quartette (stone / 3.0m x 0.95 x 0.85 / September 1990) Lacoste
 Zig Zag (stone / 2.0m x 0.4 x 0.4/ September 1996) Lacoste

In Japan
※ Currently existing
 Cerf-Volant de pierre (Stone Kite) (stone / 2.6m x 1.0 x 0.5 / July 1963) Watanabe Memorial Park, Ube Yamaguchi / 1st Ube biennale） 
 Michinashi (stone / 2.0m x 1.0 x 0.9 / August 1963) made during 1stInternational Sculpture Symposium held Manazuru, Kanagawa, Japan, which sponsored by Asahi Shimbun,then, displayed in front of Yoyogi National Gymnasium while Tokyo Olympic Games 1964. After the Olympic games, purchased by Church of Perfect Liberty Osaka 
 Kitagi (stone / 2.3m x 1.0 x 0.5 / July 1964) Kitagi Junior High School, Kitagi-island, Okayama 
 Les murs des fossils (Walles of Fossiles)(granite / 2.0m x 93.0 x 0.3 / September 1964) Yoyogi 2nd Gymnasium, Shinjyuku, Tokyo, requested by Kenzō Tange for Tokyo Olympic Games (summer) 
 Colonne de la Saison (Pillar of Season)(granite / 2.25 m / 1964) in the garden of Yoyogi 2nd Gymnasium, Shinjyuku, Tokyo　 
 Group de 6 (Group of six)(granite / 1.2m / 1964) in front of Yoyogi 2nd Gymnasium, Shinjyuku, Tokyo　 
 Borne de Terminus (To Terminal) (stone / 1.0m x 2.0 x 0.4 / March 1969) Hakone Open-Air Museum, Kanagawa
 Trois outils en pierre nr. 3 (Stone Ware No. 3) (stone / 0.4 m x 0.4 x 0.4 / 1971) National Museum of Modern Art, Kyoto, Kyoto Prefecture
 Oscillo-complex (stone / 3.0m x 1.3 x 1.2 / January 1981) The Utsukushi-ga-hara Open-Air Museum, Nagano 2nd concours of Grand Prix of Henry Moore
 Hi (Fly) (Heated Rhyolite / 3.0m x 8.0 x 0.25 / November 1981) Azubil learning Center, Shinzaichi, Tokyo
 Pazzle-Fonte (Bronze / 2.2m x 2.1 x 0.15 / February 1984) Private House, Tokyo
 Mai Couronne (Bronze / 1.0m x 1.1 x 0.5 / October 1984) Sanyo Shokai Co., Ltd., Ichigaya, Tokyo
 Méche au Ciel (Wick of heaven) (Bronze / 2.0m x 0.65 x 0.5 / November 1984) Sugino Seiseki, Ogaki, Gifu,(Galerie Nichido contemporal art exhibition and Ayumikai Sculpture exposition in Chiba)
 Six Crêtes (Date 6) (Indian sandstone/ 7.0m x 2.2 x 2.0; Fountain part: 16.0 x 32.0 / June 1985) Universiade Summer, Kobe, Hyōgo Prefecture
 Oscillo-complex II (marble / 2.0m x 0.8 x 0.7 / April 1986) Sapporo Sculpture Park, Hokkaido
 Pierre qui rit II (Laughing Stone II) (granite / 2.0 m x 0.65 x 0.6 / June 1987) Keion Temple, Nara
 Porte d'éspérance (Gate of Hope) (Indian sandstone and stone / 2.5m x 2.0 x 0.7 / October 1987) Osaka Bioscience Institute, Osaka
 Jijun (Submission) (Turkish travertin / 1.2m x 1.1 x 0.5 / June 1988) Gifu Keizai University, Gifu 
  Colonne Sapin (stone / 3.0m x 0.95 x 0.95 / June 1991) Shibukawa Culture Hall, Shibukawa, Gunma Prefecture） 
 Dix mille bouquins (Ten Thousand Books) (granite / 1.2m x 1.0 x 6.0 / October 1991) Hakata Kinmon Co., Ltd, Fukuoka
 La pierre qui m'appelle (Stone is calling) (granite / 3.0m x 0.95 x 0.95 / December 1991) Gifu Keizai University, Gifu
 Méche blanche  (White Wick) (granite / 3.0m x 0.7 x 0.7 / April 1992) Yamato Isuzu Shatai Kogyo Co., Ltd
 Jet d'eau (Water Rising) (Indian sandstone and stone / 6.0m x 1.1 x 1.1 / June 1992) Ogaki Suitopia Center, Ogaki Gifu)
 Boules en chaplet I (Balls Rosary I) (Granite / 3.0m x 1.1 x 0.95 / November 1992) Miki Park, Ogaki, Gifu
 Boules en chaplet II (Balls Rosary II) (Granite / 3.2m x 1.0 x 1.0 / November 1993) Haseko Corporation Tatsuno Hiranomachi building, Osaka 
 Gardien (Gardian) (granite / 2.5m x 1.2 x 0.7 / April October 1994) Haseko Corporation Tatsuno Hiranomachi building, Osaka 
 Récolte (Harvest) (granite/ 1.1m x 0.5 x 0.45 / May October 1996) Kinmon Mizuho Co., Ltd, Kyoto
 Dance (granite / 1.2m x 0.4 x 0.4 / October 1996) Tokoname Park, Tokoname, Aichi　
 Fly (granite / 4,0 mx 1,2 x 0,8 / November 1996) Kinmon Co., LTD, Wakayama, Wakayama
 Hiraku (Open Air) (granite / 3.0m x 1.2 x 0.7 / November 1997) Ogaki information center, Gifu 
 Tsudou (Gathering brains and gathering love) (Turkish Travertin / 3.5m x 2.2 x 0.9 / March 1998) Ogaki information center, Gifu
 Couple Heureux (Happy Couple) (granite  / 3.0m x 2.7 x 1.2 / June 1998) Kinmon production Co., Ltd, Wakayama

In other countries
※ Currently existing
  Clef au ciel (Key to Heaven) (stone/3.8m x 0.8 x 0.85/1960 ) Made in St. Margarethen Germany, then, moved to Zollikon, Zurich, Switzerland.
  Borne II (Guide II) (marble / 2.5m x 1.0 x 1.2 / August 1961) Portorož Slovenia
  Borne III (Guide III) (Stone /2.5m x 0.8 x 0.9 / September 1961) Kirchheim Germany
  Clef d'amour (Key to Love) (stone / 4.0m x 0.9 x 0.6 / May 1962) Berlin Germany
  L'ete de Berlin (Summer in Berlin) (stone/1.3 m x 0.6 x 0.6/1963) Berlin Germany
  Les germes(Seeds) (stone / 2.0m x 0.7 x 0.7 / 1962) Berlin Germany
  Hommage à Néguev (Tribute to Neguev) (marble / 3.7m x 1.7 x 0.6 / October 1962) Mizpe Ramon (Neguev) Israel
  L'hiver de Berlin (Winter in Berlin) (stone/1.3 m x 0.6 x 0.6/1963) Berlin Germany
  Hommage à Tatra (Tribute to Tatra) (stone  /3.5m x 3.0x 0.65 / August 1966) Vyšné Ružbachy, Slovakia
  Trois traces (Three Traces) (marble / 2.0m x 3.0 x 0.9 / September 1968) Vermont USA
  Babieca (simple minded) (bronze / 2.83m x 1.2 x 1.2 /　1968) Barcelona Spain
 Cascade de la lumiére(stone / 4.3m x 0.9 x 1.0 / May 1969) Federsee Oggelshausen Germany International Sculpture Symposium
  L'écho du rire (Echo of Laugh) (marble / 2.3m x 1.8 x 1.0 / April 1973)Palm Beach State College(Lannan Sculptures) Florida USA
  Fumée blanche (White Flame) (stone / 3.1m x 1.1 x 0.9 / May 1975) Middelheim Open Air Sculpture Museum, Antwerp, Belgium
  Caprice de Luberon (marble )Palm Springs International Airport California United States

References

External links

 Association Amis de Mizui, France
 Flag France Renaissance, France 
 Fontaine au filet d'eau in Villeneuve D'ascq, France 
 Oscillo-escalier in Villeneuve D'ascq, France 
 Exposition in luxeuil-les-bains, France 
 Japanese Embassy in Marseilles, France
 Caralogue of Yoyogi National Gymnagium in Tokyo, Japon 
 Sapporo Open Air Museum in Hokkaido, Japan 
 The Hakone Open Air Museum in Nagano, Japan 
 The Utsukushigahara Open Air Museum in Nagano, Japan 
 Hiraku and Tsudou Ogaki City Information Studio in Gifu, Japan 
 Gifu Keizai University in Gifu, Japan 
 Fountain "Date 6" in Hyogo, Japan 
 "Gate of Hope" Osaka Bioscience Institute in Osaka, Japan
  "To Neguev" in Mizpe Ramon, Israel
 Sants-Montjuïc Park Barcelona, Spain 
 Symposium Oggelshausen, Germany
 Symposium Slovakia Vyšné Ružbachy, Slovakia 
 Palm Beach State College, Florida, USA 
 Palm Springs Airport, Florida, USA

Japanese sculptors
Public art
École des Beaux-Arts alumni
Kobe University alumni
Tokyo University of the Arts alumni
People from Kyoto
1925 births
2008 deaths
Commandeurs of the Ordre des Arts et des Lettres
Modern sculptors
Japanese expatriates in France